The Antoinette V was an early French aircraft, first flown on 20 December 1908.

Design
Following closely to the winning formula that Levavasseur had introduced, the Antoinette V introduced a revised undercarriage, with a closely spaced pair of mainwheels at the rear of a carriage/skid which extended forward of the propeller, a tail-skid attached to the lower fin framework prevented damage to the tail section. Lateral stability on the ground was provided by outrigger wheels supported by a wire-braced framework at about half-span.

Design and development
A development of the Antoinette IV, the Antoinette V differed somewhat in having increased upper vertical tail area with no fabric covering the lower fin framework. The fuselage consisted of a wooden framework of triangular section covered with fabric, except in the cockpit area abreast the wing trailing edge. The wings were built in a similar fashion and were also covered in fabric.

Control was affected by wheels either side of the pilot's seat for roll and pitch, and a rudder bar for yaw. The pilot operated a triangular elevator hinged to the tailing edge of the large tailplane, rhomboidal ailerons hinged from the trailing edges of the wingtips, and two triangular rudders above and below the tailplane.

Delivered to Réné Demanest, the Antoinette V proved easy to fly and enjoyed some success.

Specifications (Antoinette V)

See also 

 Gastambide-Mengin monoplane
 Antoinette III
 Antoinette IV
 Antoinette VI
 Antoinette VII
 Antoinette military monoplane
 Fedor Ivanovich Bylinkin, designer of a similar aircraft, 1910

Notes

References

Further reading
 
 Munson, Kenneth. Pioneer Aircraft 1903-14
 World Aircraft Information Files. Brightstar Publishing: London. File 889 Sheet 63.

External links

 Hubert Latham: Windkiller
 Hubert Latham

1900s French experimental aircraft
5
Single-engined tractor aircraft
High-wing aircraft
Aircraft first flown in 1908